The 1874 Birkenhead by-election was fought on 24 November 1874.  The byelection was fought due to the death of the incumbent Conservative MP, John Laird.  It was won by the Conservative candidate David MacIver.

Votes

References

1874 elections in the United Kingdom
1874 in England
19th century in Cheshire
Politics of the Metropolitan Borough of Wirral
By-elections to the Parliament of the United Kingdom in Cheshire constituencies
By-elections to the Parliament of the United Kingdom in Merseyside constituencies
Birkenhead